Melikgazi, in Byzantine times known as Tzamandos, is a metropolitan district of Kayseri in the Central Anatolia region of Turkey.

History
In 1065, the town was given among other lands in the region to the Armenian king Gagik II as exchange for him renouncing the kingdom of Armenia. 

Ottoman architect Mimar Sinan was born in Melikgazi, in the town of Ağırnas around 1488.

Political structure
Along with the neighboring Kocasinan district, it was historically the core of Kayseri city, until additional districts were joined into the metropolitan area in 2004. The mayor is Mustafa Palancıoğlu (AKP). Melikgazi itself counts eight depending municipalities, some of which retain their semi-rural character, administrative boundaries of Kayseri's metropolitan area sometimes extending faster than the city itself. Melikgazi also has nine depending villages.

See also
 Kayseri - for more detailed information on Kayseri's entire metropolitan area

References

Kayseri
Populated places in Kayseri Province
Districts of Kayseri Province